Peleka Lwana (born 25 December 1990), known professionally as Nia Pearl, is a South African singer and songwriter. She gained popularity for her collaborations with South African Amapiano producers such as DJ Maphorisa and Kabza De Small.

Early life and education
Nia Pearl was born and raised in Mthatha, Eastern Cape where she grew up in a family of six sisters and was raised by a father in a close-knit family. She got inspired by her sisters to start writing her own songs. She graduated in 2013 after completing her degree in music. After completing her studies, she began carving her path into music industry.

Career
In 2014, she performed at The Standard Bank Joy of Jazz festival in Johannesburg. She also participated in the Castle Milk Stout music competition organized by Metro FM. In 2015, she performed at The Nescafe Red Mugg sessions. In April 2017, she released her debut single Liberty which featured SAMA award winning musician Kabomo. Later that same year she released her single, Yiza which was produced by renowned soul and jazz producer Luyanda Madope. The release of the single was accompanied by a video which featured guest artist, Mapele. She was also featured in the Sho Madjozi single titled, User Busy.

In 2020, she collaborated with Kabza De Small on the album, I Am the King of Amapiano, in which she featured on five songs from the project.

Discography

Singles and EPs

Collaborative projects

References

21st-century South African women singers
Amapiano musicians
Living people
People from the Eastern Cape
1990 births